The greater naked-tailed armadillo (Cabassous tatouay) is an armadillo species from South America.

Description
Larger than the closely related southern naked-tailed armadillos, adults of the greater species measure  in head-body length, with a tail  in length. There are eight or nine uniformly shaped teeth on each side of each jaw, with no identifiable incisors or canines. The carapace includes an average of 13 movable bands between the solid shields over the shoulders and hips, with each band having about 30 individual scutes. There is also a scaled shield over the upper surface of the head, with much smaller scales on the ears and on the cheeks below the eyes. The tail bears only small, isolated scales.

Distribution and habitat
Greater naked-tailed armadillos are found in southern Brazil, eastern Paraguay and Uruguay and extreme north-eastern Argentina. It inhabits lowland and submontane forests, and also relatively open areas such as the Cerrado and Pantanal. There are no recognised subspecies.

Behaviour
Greater naked-tailed armadillos feed on ants and termites and sleeps in burrows, often dug within termite mounds.

References

Armadillos
Myrmecophagous mammals
Mammals of Argentina
Mammals of Brazil
Mammals of Paraguay
Mammals of Uruguay
Fauna of the Cerrado
Fauna of the Pantanal
Mammals described in 1804